The Absinthe Drinker or The Absinthe Drinkers may refer to:
 The Absinthe Drinkers (film), a 2015 film
 The Absinthe Drinker (Manet), a painting by Édouard Manet
 Portrait of Angel Fernandez de Soto or The Absinthe Drinker, a painting by Pablo Picasso
 The Absinthe Drinker, a painting by Viktor Oliva

See also
 L'Absinthe, a painting by Edgar Degas